Phillip Matera (born 27 November 1975) is a former Australian rules footballer.

Career
Beginning his career in 1996, the 171 cm forward pocket was one of the Australian Football League's best small forwards. 

Matera is the brother of former AFL players Peter and Wally, the third of the Matera brothers to player for West Coast. He won the club's goalkicking for the second time in 2002 and his speed and ability to apply pressure often created scoring chances. He hit back strongly after a midseason form slump. In 2003 he was in good form and won All-Australian selection for the first time after kicking 62 goals. In 2004 he just missed out on All-Australian selection after kicking 61 goals, as the selectors opted to play an extra midfielder. In 2005 injury hampered his input but he still managed to kick 39 goals from 19 games. He was a late withdrawal from the 2005 AFL Grand Final due to injury.

On 23 November 2005, Matera announced his retirement from AFL football, citing a chronic back injury. Matera retired from all levels of the game effective immediately, and began focusing on his electrical contracting business, which he began in 2003. He was West Coast's most prominent goalkicker for his final years in a team which struggled for quality key-position forwards, scoring 389 goals from 179 games, the fourth-highest number of goals in the club's history. In December 2009, he become an assistant coach at Claremont.

Matera has since claimed that he walked away from the game in response to not being selected for the 2005 Grand Final. Coach John Worsfold chose the injury prone Travis Gaspar for the Grand Final, who had only played a single game all season, in spite of Matera giving Worsfold his word that he was fit enough to play.

Statistics

|-
|- style="background-color: #EAEAEA"
! scope="row" style="text-align:center" | 1996
|style="text-align:center;"|
| 33 || 5 || 8 || 6 || 30 || 16 || 46 || 11 || 6 || 1.6 || 1.2 || 6.0 || 3.2 || 9.2 || 2.2 || 1.2 || 0
|-
! scope="row" style="text-align:center" | 1997
|style="text-align:center;"|
| 33 || 19 || 30 || 23 || 182 || 66 || 248 || 74 || 30 || 1.6 || 1.2 || 9.6 || 3.5 || 13.1 || 3.9 || 1.6 || 0
|- style="background-color: #EAEAEA"
! scope="row" style="text-align:center" | 1998
|style="text-align:center;"|
| 33 || 14 || 13 || 13 || 93 || 49 || 142 || 32 || 25 || 0.9 || 0.9 || 6.6 || 3.5 || 10.1 || 2.3 || 1.8 || 0
|-
! scope="row" style="text-align:center" | 1999
|style="text-align:center;"|
| 33 || 24 || 51 || 20 || 188 || 91 || 279 || 66 || 37 || 2.1 || 0.8 || 7.8 || 3.8 || 11.6 || 2.8 || 1.5 || 4
|- style="background-color: #EAEAEA"
! scope="row" style="text-align:center" | 2000
|style="text-align:center;"|
| 33 || 19 || 49 || 30 || 164 || 55 || 219 || 57 || 26 || 2.6 || 1.6 || 8.6 || 2.9 || 11.5 || 3.0 || 1.4 || 4
|-
! scope="row" style="text-align:center" | 2001
|style="text-align:center;"|
| 33 || 16 || 31 || 22 || 111 || 43 || 154 || 48 || 20 || 1.9 || 1.4 || 6.9 || 2.7 || 9.6 || 3.0 || 1.3 || 1
|- style="background-color: #EAEAEA"
! scope="row" style="text-align:center" | 2002
|style="text-align:center;"|
| 33 || 21 || 46 || 16 || 136 || 66 || 202 || 63 || 36 || 2.2 || 0.8 || 6.5 || 3.1 || 9.6 || 3.0 || 1.7 || 1
|-
! scope="row" style="text-align:center" | 2003
|style="text-align:center;"|
| 33 || 19 || 62 || 27 || 136 || 35 || 171 || 53 || 15 || 3.3 || 1.4 || 7.2 || 1.8 || 9.0 || 2.8 || 0.8 || 2
|- style="background-color: #EAEAEA"
! scope="row" style="text-align:center" | 2004
|style="text-align:center;"|
| 33 || 23 || 61 || 42 || 155 || 48 || 203 || 65 || 32 || 2.7 || 1.8 || 6.7 || 2.1 || 8.8 || 2.8 || 1.4 || 1
|-
! scope="row" style="text-align:center" | 2005
|style="text-align:center;"|
| 33 || 19 || 38 || 28 || 121 || 40 || 161 || 47 || 22 || 2.0 || 1.5 || 6.4 || 2.1 || 8.5 || 2.5 || 1.2 || 1
|- class="sortbottom"
! colspan=3| Career
! 179
! 389
! 227
! 1316
! 509
! 1825
! 516
! 249
! 2.2
! 1.3
! 7.4
! 2.8
! 10.2
! 2.9
! 1.4
! 14
|}

References

External links

1975 births
Living people
South Fremantle Football Club players
Australian people of Italian descent
West Coast Eagles players
All-Australians (AFL)
Australian rules footballers from Western Australia
People from Wagin, Western Australia
Western Australian State of Origin players
Indigenous Australian players of Australian rules football